General elections were held in the Marshall Islands on 19 November 2007.

Campaign
One of the election issues was whether to switch recognition from Taiwan to the China, with the opposition in favour of recognising China instead. However, Aelon Kein Ad stated on 28 November that they would not end ties with the ROC if they won the election.

Conduct
Due to delays in opening the polling stations (while they were meant to open at 7 AM, some did not open until midday and one did not open before 4 PM) polling continued until after midnight. While only 36,000 people were eligible to vote, the large number of postal ballots meant that results were not to be known before 4 December.

Results
Early results with 40% of the vote counted indicated a number of government party members could lose their seats, meaning it was possible that the opposition has won the election. On 30 November, the opposition Aelon̄ Kein Ad declared victory, claiming it had already won 15 of the 17 seats necessary for a majority and that it expected to gain about 20 to 22 seats.

The final vote count began on 4 December 2007. The opposition officially voiced their protest when the election website had not been updated by 8 December since the preliminary results were published on 27 November, questioning the legality of the recounting of votes from the outer islands, allegedly an attempt to change the results in four very close seats. The opposition party also claimed to have the necessary 17 senators to govern.

Final, unofficial results were released on 10 December; the candidates then had two weeks to file recount petitions and court challenges. As both the ruling United Democratic Party and the opposition Aelon Kein Ad claim to have the 17 MPs required to form a government, and since two seats were decided by a single vote and two others by five votes, many recount petitions are expected to be filed.

Figures from 12 December indicated that President Kassai Note's United Democratic Party had 14 seats while the opposition United People's Party (which forms part of the Aelon Kein Ad coalition), led by former speaker Litokwa Tomeing, had 15 seats. Aelon̄ Kein Ad continued to claim they had the 17 seats necessary to govern, and the election was considered likely be decided by the courts.

Both parties attempted to get independent MPs to join them, with both sides about two or three seats short of a majority.

Recounts for Maloelap and Likiep were ordered for 3 January 2008, and voters from the US have appealed for their votes to be counted as well despite some problems with the required post stamp.

Aftermath
In early January 2008, Taiwan accused China of interfering in the post-election process in a bid to help the opposition; the Taiwanese government claimed China hoped to have the Marshall Islands switch recognition to the China if the opposition gained power.

According to the results of the 2008 presidential election and the results of the election of the speaker, the opposition (consisting of Aelon̄ Kein Ad and the UPP) seemed to have either 18 or 17 seats, as opposed to the former government's 15 or 16 seats.

References

Elections in the Marshall Islands
Marshall
General election
Legislature of the Marshall Islands
Non-partisan elections
Election and referendum articles with incomplete results